Homai in Iran may refer to:

Geography
 Homai, Razavi Khorasan: a village in Khorasan Province, Iran

People
 Jalaluddin Humai or Homaei, 20th-century Iranian scholar (died 1980)
 Amin Homaei or Homai, Iranian musician (born 1984)